Mount Limbara (Gallurese: Monti di Limbara) is a rocky granitic massif in north-eastern Sardinia, Italy.

It is located in the geographical and historical region of Gallura.

Its highest peak is Punta Sa Berritta (1,362 m above sea level). Its area belongs to the comuni of Calangianus, Tempio Pausania, Berchidda and Oschiri, in the province of Olbia-Tempio.

History

The name could derive from the Latin Limes Balares ("Boundary of the Balares"), given it by the Romans as it marked the frontier with the territory still in the hands of the Balares, a late Nuragic tribe.

Mount Limbara was affected by a major forest fire in 1936 and its cork oaks woods were  replaced with pines, after a work of reforestation. Following World War II, giant sequoias were planted as well.

On the top of the massif, a NATO U.S. Air Force Communications Relay Station and a Carabinieri barracks were located. Today it is used as a telecommunications center for the Italian Air Force and a heliport for the Servizio Antincendi. It is also the location of all the major TV relay stations of West Sardinia.

Limbara